Stockholm Sojourn is an album by the International Jazz Orchestra directed by Benny Golson which was recorded in Sweden in 1964 and originally released on the Prestige label.

Reception

The AllMusic review states, "Golson, who does not play at all on this set, seemed inspired by the large instrumentation -- a full orchestra with trumpets, trombones, French horns, several English horns doubling on oboes, five reeds, up to six additional flutes and a pianoless rhythm section -- and his charts (six of his originals and three standards) are both inventive and full of subtle surprises".

Track listing
All compositions by Benny Golson except as indicated
 "Stockholm Sojourn" - 4:35     
 "Tryst" - 3:25     
 "Are You Real?" - 3:20     
 "Goodbye" (Gordon Jenkins) - 6:36     
 "Waltz for Debby" (Bill Evans) - 4:25     
 "My Foolish Heart" (Ned Washington, Victor Young) - 5:25     
 "A Swedish Villa" - 3:49     
 "I Remember Clifford" - 4:46     
 "The Call" - 4:30

Collective personnel
Benny Golson - arranger, conductor
Benny Bailey, Bosse Broberg, Bertil Lövgren, Bengt-Arne Wallin - trumpet
Grachan Moncur III, Åke Persson, Eje Thelin, Georg Vernon, Jörgen Johansson - trombone
Carl Nyström, Bengt Olsson, Elis Kårvall, Willem Foch - French horn
Runo Ericksson - euphonium
Lars Skoglund - oboe, English horn
Alf Nilsson, Ingvar Holst, Erik Björkhager - oboe
Bengt Christiansson, Nils Wahrby, Yngve Sandström, Gösta Ströberg, Ulf Bergström - flute
Arne Domnérus - alto saxophone, clarinet
Claes Rosendahl  - tenor saxophone
Bjarne Nerem - tenor saxophone
Cecil Payne - baritone saxophone
Rune Falk - baritone saxophone, clarinet
Torsten Wennberg- saxophone, clarinet
Roman Dylag - bass
Egil Johansen - drums

Sources
 Harry Nicolausson - Swedish Jazz Discography, Stockholm 1983.

References 

Prestige Records albums
Benny Golson albums
1965 albums
Albums arranged by Benny Golson